Roßleben-Wiehe is a town and a municipality in the district Kyffhäuserkreis, in Thuringia, Germany. It was created with effect from 1 January 2019 by the merger of the former municipalities of Roßleben, Wiehe, Donndorf and Nausitz.

References

Kyffhäuserkreis